Events in the year 1839 in Norway.

Incumbents
Monarch: Charles III John

Events

Arts and literature
 Det Dramatiske Selskab in Hammerfest was founded.

Births
25 March – Frederik Collett, painter (d.1914)
7 June – Karl Ditlev Rygh, archaeologist and politician (d.1915)
12 June – Theodor Peterson, businessperson and politician (d.1888)
23 December – Carl Otto Løvenskiold, naval officer, politician and land owner (died 1916).

Full date unknown
Walter Scott Dahl, politician and Minister (d.1906)
Ole Falck Ebbell, architect (d.1919)
Lars Knutson Liestøl, politician and Minister (d.1912)

Deaths
10 June – Jacob Munch, painter and military officer (b.1776)
2 December – Andreas Landmark, politician (b.1769)

Full date unknown
Jens Esmark, mountain climber and professor of mineralogy (born 1763)
Peder Tonning, politician (born 1782)
Lars Larsen Forsæth, farmer and politician (born 1759).

See also

References